Frank Marion Abruzzino Jr. (January 22, 1908 – June 13, 1986) was an American football back who played two seasons in the National Football League with the Brooklyn Dodgers and Cincinnati Reds. He played college football at Colgate University and attended Shinnston High School in Shinnston, West Virginia.

References

External links
Just Sports Stats

1908 births
1986 deaths
Players of American football from West Virginia
American football quarterbacks
American football defensive backs
American football centers
American football linebackers
Colgate Raiders football players
Brooklyn Dodgers (NFL) players
Cincinnati Reds (NFL) players
People from Shinnston, West Virginia